Monroe Township is one of the twelve townships of Allen County, Ohio, United States. The 2010 census found 2,226 people in the township, 1,702 of whom lived in the unincorporated portions of the township.

Geography
Located in the northern part of the county, it borders the following townships:
Pleasant Township, Putnam County - north
Richland Township - east
Jackson Township - southeast corner
Bath Township - south
Sugar Creek Township - southwest
Sugar Creek Township, Putnam County - northwest

The village of Cairo is located in southwestern Monroe Township.

Name and history
It is one of twenty-two Monroe Townships statewide.

Government
The township is governed by a three-member board of trustees, who are elected in November of odd-numbered years to a four-year term beginning on the following January 1. Two are elected in the year after the presidential election and one is elected in the year before it. There is also an elected township fiscal officer, who serves a four-year term beginning on April 1 of the year after the election, which is held in November of the year before the presidential election. Vacancies in the fiscal officership or on the board of trustees are filled by the remaining trustees.

References

External links
Allen County website

Townships in Allen County, Ohio
Townships in Ohio